There are two species of skink named Barbour's ground skink:
 Kaestlea travancorica, endemic to southern Western Ghats
 Scincella barbouri, found in China

Reptile common names